Diedorf is a municipality in the district of Augsburg, in Bavaria, Germany.

Diedorf may also refer to:

Diedorf, Thuringia, a municipality in the Wartburgkreis district, in Thuringia, Germany

See also
Die Dorfschule, a 1918 German opera by Felix Weingartner
Diesdorf, a municipality in Saxony-Anhalt, Germany
Dierdorf, a municipality in Rhineland-Palatinate, Germany
Driedorf, a community in Hesse, Germany